Merogregarina is a genus of parasitic alveolate in the phylum Apicomplexa. Species in this genus infect marine invertebrates.

Taxonomy

This species was described in 1908 by Porter.

There is one species in this genus - Merogregarina amaroucii.

Description

The trophozoites are found in the intestinal lumen. They measure 23-31 microns x 11-15 microns. They are initially ovoid and become vermiform as they mature. The single nucleus lies at the anterior end and has one nucleolus.

The trophozoites develop in multinucleated schizonts which give rise to 8-20 merozoites. The merozoites are 5-6 microns x 1 micron.

The sporocysts give rise to eight sporozoites.

Life cycle

This species is found in species of the ascidian genus Amaroucium.

The parasite infects the gastrointestinal tract and is presumably transmitted by the orofaecal route but the details of this mechanism are presently unknown.

Schizogony is intracellular.

References

Apicomplexa genera
Conoidasida